Kaleidoscope World is the second studio album by the British band Swing Out Sister. It was released in 1989 and features the singles "You on My Mind" (UK #28), "Where in the World?" (UK #47), "Forever Blue" (UK #80), and "Waiting Game". With the addition of an orchestra, this album features a more sophisticated, easy listening/retro sound than their previous synth-oriented debut album, 1987's It's Better to Travel. The album reached #9 on the UK Albums Chart.

Background
The album was notable for being released on the newly reactivated Polygram subsidiary label Fontana Records, which had been a highly successful record label in the 1960s (something reflected in the stylised cover art for Kaleidoscope World). The album also features solos from the veteran harmonica player Tommy Reilly. Original band member Martin Jackson left Swing Out Sister during the making of this album. Although the liner notes give "special thanks to Martin Jackson" and his co-writing credits appear on the songs "Tainted" and "Between Strangers", they also point out that "Swing Out Sister are Corinne Drewery and Andy Connell." Jimmy Webb arranged and conducted the orchestra for "Forever Blue" and "Precious Words."

Video EP
In 1990 the video EP Kaleidoscope World – The Videos was released featuring videos for the singles and a video for "The Kaleidoscope Affair".  Excerpts from "Coney Island Man" were also used as incidental music.

Track listing
LP and cassette version
 "You on My Mind" – (3:32)  (Andy Connell, Corinne Drewery, Paul Staveley O'Duffy) 
 "Where in the World" – (5:33)  (A. Connell, C. Drewery) 
 "Forever Blue" – (4:17)  (A. Connell, C. Drewery) 
 "Heart For Hire" – (4:25)  (A. Connell, C. Drewery) 
 "Tainted" – (3:59)  (A. Connell, C. Drewery, Martin Jackson) 
 "Waiting Game" – (4:15)  (A. Connell, C. Drewery) 
 "Precious Words" – (4:13)  (A. Connell, C. Drewery) 
 "Masquerade" – (4:46)  (A. Connell, C. Drewery) 
 "Between Strangers" – (4:06)  (A. Connell, C. Drewery, M. Jackson) 
 "The Kaleidoscope Affair" – (3:09)  (A. Connell, C. Drewery) 

CD version
 "You on My Mind" – (3:32)
 "Where in the World" – (5:33)
 "Forever Blue" – (4:17)
 "Heart For Hire" – (4:25)
 "Tainted" – (3:59)
 "Waiting Game" – (4:15)
 "Precious Words" – (4:13)
 "Masquerade" – (4:46)
 "Between Strangers" – (4:06)
 "The Kaleidoscope Affair" – (3:09)
 "Coney Island Man" – (3:43) (A. Connell, C. Drewery)
 "Precious Words (Instrumental) – (4:11)
 "Forever Blue (String Mix) – (4:13)
 "Masquerade (Instrumental) – (4:46)

Notes
The outro of track # 3, "Forever Blue", contains an interpolation of "Midnight Cowboy" (1969), written and performed by John Barry.

Personnel
Adapted from the liner notes of Kaleidoscope World.
Swing Out Sister 
 Corinne Drewery – lead vocals, brass arrangements (1, 4, 10), string arrangements (1, 4, 10), additional backing vocals (2)
 Andy Connell – keyboards, brass arrangements (1, 4, 5, 10), string arrangements (1, 2, 4, 5, 8, 9, 10, 14), additional backing vocals (2), drum programming (11)
Additional Musicians
 Martyn Phillips – synthesizers, computer programming 
 Jess Bailey – string synthesizer (6)
 Tim Cansfield – guitars (1), electric guitar (2, 10), guitar (3, 4, 6, 7, 9)
 Vini Reilly – Spanish guitar (2)
 Phil Palmer – guitar (6)
 Chris Whitten – drums (1, 2, 3, 10)
 Martin Jackson – drum programming (5, 7-10, 14)
 Luís Jardim – percussion (1-8, 10, 12, 14), berimbau (8, 14)
 Frank Ricotti – glockenspiel (2, 3, 4, 6, 13), vibraphone (2, 3, 4, 13), snare drum (4), timpani (4, 7, 12), percussion (6), tubular bells (6)
 Jamie Talbot – saxophone (1)
 Phil Todd – saxophone (1)
 Dan Higgins – saxophone (2, 9)
 Dave Bishop – saxophone (6)
 Snake Davis – saxophone (6)
 Pete Beachill – trombone (1, 6)
 Bill Reichenbach, Jr. – trombone (2, 9)
 John Thirkell - trumpet (1, 6)
 Guy Barker – trumpet (1, 6), flugelhorn (4)
 Simon Gardner – trumpet (1)
 Gary Grant – trumpet (2, 9)
 Jerry Hey – trumpet (2, 9), horn arrangements (2, 9)
 John Barclay – trumpet (6)
 Paul Staveley O'Duffy – brass arrangements (1, 4, 5, 10), string arrangements (1, 2, 4, 5, 10), drum programming (4, 6)
 Jimmy Webb – orchestra arrangements and conductor (3, 7, 12, 13)
 Richard Niles – brass and string arrangements (6)
 Stephanie de Sykes – backing vocals (1)
 Clare Torry – backing vocals (1)
 Chyna Gordon – backing vocals (2, 3, 6, 7, 8)
 Derek Green – backing vocals (2, 3, 6, 7, 8)
 Nat Augustin – backing vocals (3, 7, 8)
 Dee Lewis – backing vocals (3, 6, 7, 8)
Orchestra (Tracks 3 & 7)
 Cello – Helen Liebmann, Paul Kegg, Ben Kennard and Roger Smith
 Double bass – Mike Brittain and Chris Laurence
 Flugelhorn – Graham Ashton and Mike Hobart
 Flute – Andrew Findon
 French horn – John Pigneguy and John Rooke
 Harmonica – Tommy Reilly
 Harp – Fiona Hibbert
 Viola – Levine Andrade, Roger Chase and David Emanuel 
 Violin – Jim Archer, Bill Benham, Mark Berrow, Elizabeth Edwards, Roger Garland, Wilf Gibson, Tim Good, John Kitchen, Peter Oxer, George Robertson, Godfrey Salmon, Rolf Wilson and Gavyn Wright (leader)
 Vocals – Lance Ellington

Production
 Producers – Paul Staveley O'Duffy (Tracks 1-10, 12, 13 & 14); Swing Out Sister (Track 11).
 Engineers – Paul Staveley O'Duffy (Tracks 1-10, 12, 13 & 14); Stuart James (Track 11).
 Additional Engineers – Howard Bernstein, Richard Edwards and Roland Herrington.
 Recorded at Lillie Yard Studios, Master Rock Studios and Sarm West Studios (London, UK).
 Sleeve Design – Trevor Johnson and Tony Panas
 Photography – Mark Bayley

See also 
 1989 in music

References 

1989 albums
Swing Out Sister albums
Fontana Records albums